The telefonic tripolar plug is the first type of telephone plug used in Italy. It has also been used in Finland, Norway and Turkey in older installations.

Structure
It uses three pins: the two on the top are joined with the twisted pair of cables bringing the signal; the third, off-center, can be used for loop through when more sockets exist. In Finland, the third pin is earth ground, but it is rarely connected.

Every socket complies with Italian standards. Formerly each of them was installed by SIP, now TIM, and had their trademark. Sockets without trademark exist also. Since 2007, TIM no longer installs tripolar sockets in new electrical wiring systems.

In Finland, five-pin variant with second line also exists. Three-pin plug is compatible with five-pin socket.

Use
The tripolar plug has been supplanted by the international RJ11 standard, both because it is more diffused in new technology devices and because the tripolar plug isn't suitable for ISDN.

Telephone connectors